The Women's 15 kilometre pursuit competition at the FIS Nordic World Ski Championships 2019 was held on 23 February 2019.

Results
The race was started at 11:00.

References

Women's 15 kilometre pursuit